Pandavapura is a Municipality Town in Mandya district in the Indian state of Karnataka.

Geography 
It has an average elevation of 709 metres (2326 feet).

Demographics 
 India census, Pandavapura had a population of 18,236. Males constitute 51% of the population and females 49%.  Pandavapura has an average literacy rate of 67%, higher than the national average of 59.5%: male literacy is 72%, and female literacy is 62%.  In Pandavapura, 12% of the population is under 6 years of age.

History 
The name Pandavapura means "Town of Pandavas". Mythology states that the Pandavas during their period of exile stayed here for some time, and Kunti, mother of the Pandavas, liked the hillock so much that it became one of her favorite haunts. The town is also named after the Pandavas because of their brief stay in this region.  The name "French Rock" dates back to India's Pre-Independence days, the place was used as the camping ground by the French army, which came to help Tippu Sultan in his war against the British. It is believed that French named the small town as "French Rocks", as the town is in the vicinity of two rocky hills. After Indian Independence, these rocky hills called as "Kunti Betta" by locals. There was another smaller hill called "Kauravara betta" on the western side of the town which has been mined out of existence  for its stones.
Pandavapura is approximately 130 km from Bangalore and   25 km from Mysore.

Transport 

Pandavapura is well connected by trains and buses.  Most of the trains which run between Bangalore and Mysore stop in Pandavapura.  The Pandavapura railway station is 4 km away from the town.  There are very few direct buses runs from Bengaluru to Pandavapura
.

Tourism 

Pandavapura town is surrounded by well-known tourist spots.
Melukote
Krishnaraja Sagar
Kunthi betta
Kere Thonnur

Notable people 
 H. R. Shastry - veteran actor in Kannada, was born in Halebeedu village
 Vijaya Narasimha - noted lyricist in the Kannada Film Industry, was born in Halebeedu village
 Jayalakshmi Seethapura - noted writer, folklorist; born in Seethapura village
 K. S. Puttannaiah - Leader and politician
 C. S. Puttaraju - politician

Image gallery

See also 
 Narayanapura
 Kere Thonnur
 Shingapoore
 Naganahalli
 Byadarahalli
 Yeliyur
 Gummanahalli
 Krishnarajpet
 Chinakurali

References 

Cities and towns in Mandya district